Donta is a given name and surname. Notable people with the name include:

Given name
Donta Abron (born 1972), American football player
Donta Hall (born 1997), American professional basketball player
Donta Jones (born 1972), American football player
Donta Smith (born 1983), American-Venezuelan basketball player, 2014 Israeli Basketball Premier League MVP

Surname
Eleni Donta (born 1980), Greek marathon runner
Praveen Kumar Donta (born 1990), Indian Computer Science Researcher working in Austria - (https://dsg.tuwien.ac.at/team/pdonta/)

See also
Dont'a Hightower (born 1990), American football player
D'Onta Foreman (born 1996), American football player
Dontae, given name
Donte, given name